Frank "The Tank" or Frank the Tank may refer to:

Frank Pritchard, Australian rugby league player
Frank Kaminsky, American professional basketball player
Frank "The Tank" Ricard, a character from the 2003 film Old School, portrayed by Will Ferrell